George Frederick Harris (1856–1924) was a Welsh portrait and landscape painter. He was born in Birmingham, West Midlands, UK on October 30, 1856. Harris lived in Merthyr Tydfil, Wales for most of his life, before emigrating to Australia in 1920. He died in Sydney, Australia due to myocarditis and pneumonia.

Marriage 
Harris married Jemima Reid Harris, née Bowmen in Chelmsford, Essex, UK in August 1882. They had two children Claude Harris and Ethel Harris. After Harris divorced with Jemima, he married Rosetta Elizabeth Harris, née Lucas in 1901 and had nine children. Pixie O'Harris is one of his children who is well known as a children's book author and illustrator, and Rolf Harris who is an Australian composer and painter is Harris's grandson.

Life 
Harris was a chairman and secretary of the South Wales Art Society, Cadiff, Wales, and had a business of portrait and photography in Merthyr Tydfil, Wales before emigrating to Australia in 1920.

Collections 
The Cyfarthfa Castle Museum & Art Gallery, Merthyr Tydfil is holding the collection of portraits by George Frederick Harris.

Two of G. F. Harris's paintings, dated 1893 and 1896, were auctioned by Bonhams auctioneers in 2005. There are over 40 paintings attributed to Harris now held by public bodies or in public art collections.

References

1856 births
1924 deaths
19th-century Welsh painters
20th-century Welsh painters
20th-century British male artists
People from Merthyr Tydfil
Welsh emigrants to Australia
Welsh portrait painters
Still life painters
Archibald Prize finalists
Welsh male painters
19th-century Welsh male artists
20th-century Welsh male artists